Rupert Evans (born 9 March 1977) is a British actor. He is a member of the Royal Shakespeare Company and starred in the Amazon series The Man in the High Castle and also in the CW's Charmed series. In 2021 Evans appeared in Bridgerton series 2, portraying Edmund Bridgerton, late husband to Violet Bridgerton (Ruth Gemmell) and father to the entire Bridgerton clan.

Early life
Evans was brought up on a farm in Stowe-by-Chartley, Staffordshire, England, near Stoke-on-Trent. Evans was educated at Bilton Grange School, a boarding independent school in the village of Dunchurch, near the market town of Rugby in Warwickshire in the West Midlands region of England, followed by Milton Abbey School, a boarding independent school in the village of Milton Abbas, near the market town of Blandford Forum in Dorset in South West England, and the Webber Douglas Academy of Dramatic Art, at the time based in South Kensington in London.

Career
Early in his career, Evans appeared in the drama Crime and Punishment starring John Simm, and North and South starring Richard Armitage.

Evans' first major film role was as FBI Agent John Myers in director Guillermo del Toro's 2004 adaptation of the Mike Mignola comic book Hellboy. He also appeared in Agora, which was filmed in Malta with Rachel Weisz and Max Minghella.

Evans has starred as Edmund Allingham in the BBC's The Village; as Elliot Howe in Rogue; as Peter Fleming in Fleming: The Man Who Would Be Bond; and as Brother Godwyn in World Without End. He also guest-starred in ITV's High Stakes sitcom with Richard Wilson, and Paradise Heights, the BBC drama starring Neil Morrissey. Evans was a lead in the Amazon series The Man in the High Castle.

In 2014, Evans starred in the horror film The Canal, and in 2016 had a supporting role in the horror film The Boy.

In February 2018, Evans was cast in a regular role for The CW's fantasy drama series Charmed, a reboot of the 1998 series of the same name. The reboot "centers on three sisters in a college town who discover they are witches." Evans plays Harry Greenwood, a college professor and the sisters' whitelighter – a guardian angel who protects and guides witches.

Filmography

Film

Television

Videogame
 Q.U.B.E. (2011) as 919

Theatre
 Venetian Heat
 Macbeth
 Sweet Panic (2003)
 Breathing Corpses (2005)
 Romeo and Juliet (2006) as Romeo
 Kiss of the Spider Woman (2007) Donmar Warehouse, London & tour
 Life Is a Dream (2009) Donmar Warehouse
 Fear (2013), Bush Theatre

Notes

References

External links
 

Living people
Alumni of the Webber Douglas Academy of Dramatic Art
English male film actors
English male television actors
English male stage actors
English male video game actors
English male Shakespearean actors
Royal Shakespeare Company members
Male actors from London
People educated at Milton Abbey School
People educated at Bilton Grange
People from the Borough of Stafford
21st-century English male actors
1977 births